Adriano de Jesús Espaillat Rodríguez (born September 27, 1954) is a Dominican-American politician. He previously served in the New York State Senate and the New York State Assembly.

Espaillat was a ranking member of the New York Senate Housing, Construction and Community Development Committee and chaired the Senate Latino Caucus. He represented the neighborhoods of Marble Hill, Inwood, Washington Heights, Hamilton Heights, Manhattanville, Morningside Heights, East Harlem and the Upper West Side in Manhattan.

Espaillat is a Democrat. He challenged then-Representative Charles Rangel in the Democratic primaries in 2012 and 2014, eventually winning the Democratic nomination in 2016 after Rangel announced his retirement. Espaillat represents one of the most Democratic districts in the country, with a Cook Partisan Voting Index of D+38.

Early life and education
Espaillat was born on September 27, 1954, in Santiago, Dominican Republic, to Melba (née Cabral) and Ulises Espaillat. He is a great-grandson of Dominican President Ulises Espaillat. Espaillat also has African ancestry and is of mixed Afro-Latino lineage. He and his family moved to the United States in 1964. After overstaying a tourist visa, the Espaillats became lawful permanent residents (Green Card holders) in 1965.

Espaillat grew up in Washington Heights. He graduated from Bishop Dubois High School in 1974 and earned his B.S. degree in political science at Queens College in 1978.

Personal life
Espaillat lives in Inwood, Manhattan. He is a member of Phi Beta Sigma fraternity.

Espaillat married Martha Madera in 1979. He has two children and is a grandfather. He is a Yankees fan.

Espaillat is a Catholic, but disagrees with the Church on certain issues.

Earlier career
Espaillat served as the Manhattan Court Services Coordinator for the New York City Criminal Justice Agency, a nonprofit organization that provides indigent legal services and works to reduce unnecessary pretrial detention and post-sentence incarceration costs. As a state-certified conflict resolution mediator and volunteer with the Washington Heights Inwood Conflict Resolutions and Mediation Center, Espaillat helped resolve hundreds of conflicts.

He later worked as Director of the Washington Heights Victims Services Community Office, an organization offering counseling and other services to families of victims of homicides and other crimes. From 1994 to 1996, Espaillat served as the Director of Project Right Start, a national initiative funded by the Robert Wood Johnson Foundation to combat substance abuse by educating the parents of preschool children.

Before his election to the New York State Assembly, Espaillat was an active voice on Manhattan Community Board 12, and president of the 34th Precinct Community Council. Espaillat also served on Governor Mario Cuomo's Dominican-American Advisory Board from 1991 to 1993.

New York State Assembly

Espaillat served in the New York State Assembly from 1997 to 2010. He was elected in 1996, defeating 16-year incumbent John Brian Murtaugh in the Democratic primary. Espaillat chaired the Black, Puerto Rican, Hispanic & Asian Legislative Caucus, and committees on small business and children & families.

In the Assembly, Espaillat was a vocal advocate for tenants, consumers, veterans, immigrants and local businesses. He passed laws encouraging the construction and preservation of affordable housing, giving low-income day care workers the right to organize and obtain health care, and sponsored measures to improve hospital translation services. He also established a higher education scholarship fund for relatives of the victims of American Airlines Flight 587, which crashed on November 12, 2001. Despite national Republican and conservative criticism, Espaillat strongly supported efforts in 2007 to allow illegal immigrants to obtain driver's licenses.

After a wave of assaults and murders against livery cab drivers in 2000 that left over 10 dead, Espaillat passed legislation strengthening penalties for violent crimes against livery drivers and enabled their families to receive New York State Crime Victims Board funding. Livery cabs work in less affluent neighborhoods of New York that typically lack access to yellow cabs.

Espaillat took legal action against power utility Con Edison after equipment failures led to a two-day blackout in Upper Manhattan in July 1999 that caused financial damage to restaurants, bodegas and other small businesses. Con Edison subsequently agreed to invest an additional $100 million in Upper Manhattan electrical infrastructure at no cost to ratepayers and was required to refund customers billed for expenses related to the blackout.

New York State Senate

Elections

2010 
Espaillat ran for State Senate in 2010 after incumbent Eric Schneiderman announced his campaign for New York Attorney General. Espaillat received more than 50% of the vote in a four-way Democratic party. In 2012, Espaillat defeated then-Assemblyman Guillermo Linares 62% - 38% in the Democratic primary.

2014 
After losing to Charles Rangel in the Democratic primary for Congress, Espaillat announced candidacy for reelection to his State Senate seat, facing former City Councilman Robert Jackson. He was reelected with 50.3% of the vote to Jackson's 42.7%.

Tenure 
In 2011, Espaillat led the fight to safeguard and strengthen rent regulation for over 1 million affordable housing apartments that was set to expire that year. While tenant protections had been weakened in the past, the agreement reached that year made it more difficult to convert affordable housing to market rate and created a new Tenant Protection Unit within the state's housing agency.

Espaillat also passed legislation increasing enforcement against businesses that sell alcohol to minors and authored the Notary Public Advertising Act, to crack down on public notaries who prey on vulnerable immigrants by offering fraudulent legal services. He voted in favor of marriage equality legislation in 2011.

State Senate committee assignments
 Housing, Construction & Community Development (Ranking Member)
 Environmental Conservation
 Higher Education
 Codes
 Rules
 Judiciary
 Finance
 Insurance

U.S. House of Representatives

Elections

2012

In 2012, Espaillat ran in the Democratic primary for New York's 13th congressional district, in a crowded field that included 42-year incumbent Charles Rangel. The seat had long been a majority-black district, but redistricting after the 2010 census made it a 55% Hispanic-majority district.

In the Democratic primary—the real contest in this heavily Democratic district—Rangel beat Espaillat, 44% to 42%, a margin of less than 1,000 votes. Espaillat placed first in the Bronx section of the district and parts of Upper Manhattan.

The election was marked by reports that Spanish-speaking voters were either turned away at the polls or forced to use affidavit ballots. The New York City Board of Elections was also sharply criticized for its poor handling of the election and subsequent legal proceedings.

2014

In 2014, Espaillat ran against Rangel again, losing for the second consecutive time, 47.7% to 43.1%.

2016

In November 2015, Espaillat announced he would give up his State Senate seat to run for Congress again. He was running for an open seat; Rangel had announced in 2014 that he would not seek a 22nd term in 2016. In the Democratic primary, he narrowly defeated his nearest challenger, state assemblyman Keith L. T. Wright, with 36% of the vote. This made him an overwhelming favorite in the general election, which he won with 89% of the vote.

When Espaillat took office on January 3, 2017, he became only the third person to represent what is now the 13th in 72 years. Adam Clayton Powell, Jr. held the district from 1945 to 1971; Rangel had won the seat after defeating Powell in the 1970 primary. The district had been numbered as the 22nd district from 1945 to 1953, the 16th from 1953 to 1963, the 18th from 1963 to 1973, the 19th from 1973 to 1983, the 16th from 1983 to 1993, the 15th from 1993 to 2013, and has been the 13th since 2013.

Tenure 

Espaillat serves as a member of the Foreign Affairs Committee, the Committee on Education and the Workforce, and the Committee on Small Business. He is a member of the Congressional Hispanic Caucus (CHC) and was appointed chair of the CHC Task Force for Transportation, Infrastructure and Housing.

In August 2017, after the 2017 Unite the Right rally in Charlottesville, Virginia, Espaillat and Pennsylvania Representative Dwight E. Evans introduced legislation banning Confederate monuments on federal property.

Espaillat has been critical of Brazil's president Jair Bolsonaro. In March 2019 he and 29 other Democratic lawmakers wrote Secretary of State Mike Pompeo a letter that read in part, "Since the election of far-right candidate Jair Bolsonaro as president, we have been particularly alarmed by the threat Bolsonaro's agenda poses to the LGBTQ+ community and other minority communities, women, labor activists, and political dissidents in Brazil."

Committee assignments 
 Appropriations
 Subcommittee on the Legislative Branch
 Subcommittee on State, Foreign Operations, and Related Programs
 Subcommittee on Transportation, Housing and Urban Development, and Related Agencies
 Committee on Education and Labor
 Subcommittee on Higher Education and Workforce Investment

Caucus memberships 
 Congressional Diabetes Caucus
 Congressional Foster Youth Caucus
 Congressional Hispanic Caucus (Chair of the CHC Task Force for Transportation, Infrastructure and Housing)
 Congressional LGBT Equality Caucus
 Congressional Progressive Caucus
 Democratic Israel Working Group
 Medicare for All Caucus
 New American Caucus

Political positions

Guns
In March 2021, Espaillat and Representative Brad Schneider proposed legislation to close the Ghost guns loophole in an effort to curb gun violence.

Immigration
Espaillat visited an immigration detention facility in Carrizo Springs, Texas, vowing that the U.S. needs to do a better job of connecting migrant children detained at the southern border with their families. The first former illegal immigrant in Congress, Espaillat claimed he overstayed a tourist visa in the 1960s and is a staunch supporter of the American Dream and Promise Act.

Israel
In 2019, Espaillat supported the Israel Anti-Boycott Act, an effort that called for criminal penalties of up to $1 million for companies that support the Boycott, Divest and Sanctions Movement against Israel. In August 2019, he released a statement condemning Israeli Prime Minister Benjamin Netanyahu’s decision to deny Representatives Rashida Tlaib and Ilhan Omar entry into Israel.

Syria
In 2023, Espaillat was among 56 Democrats to vote in favor of H.Con.Res. 21 which directed President Joe Biden to remove U.S. troops from Syria within 180 days.

Electoral history

New York City Council

New York State Assembly

New York State Senate

U.S. House of Representatives

See also
 List of Hispanic and Latino Americans in the United States Congress

References

External links

 Congressman Adriano Espaillat official U.S. House website
 Campaign website
 

 

|-

|-

|-

1954 births
20th-century American politicians
21st-century American politicians
American politicians of Dominican Republic descent
Candidates in the 2012 United States elections
Candidates in the 2014 United States elections
City University of New York faculty
Democratic Party members of the United States House of Representatives from New York (state)
Descendants of Ulises Espaillat
Dominican Republic emigrants to the United States
Dominican Republic people of French descent
Dominican Republic people of Spanish descent
Hispanic and Latino American members of the United States Congress
Hispanic and Latino American state legislators in New York (state)
Living people
Democratic Party members of the New York State Assembly
Mixed-race Dominicans
Democratic Party New York (state) state senators
Politicians from New York City
Queens College, City University of New York alumni
People from Inwood, Manhattan
People from Washington Heights, Manhattan
Undocumented immigrants to the United States